Orthosia hibisci, the speckled green fruitworm moth, is a moth of the family Noctuidae. It is found in most of North America, except in desert regions. The habitat consists of moist forests, riparian, agricultural and urban areas.

The wingspan is 30–38 mm. The colour ranges from pale buff-grey to dark red-brown. The forewing pattern is also highly variable, from almost non-patterned to strongly banded forms. Adults are on wing from late March to April in one generation per year.

The larvae feed on various hardwood plants, including species in the families Aceraceae, Ericaceae, Betulaceae, Rhamnaceae, Rosaceae, Caprifoliaceae, Fagaceae and Salicaceae.

Subspecies
 Orthosia hibisci hibisci
 Orthosia hibisci brucei (Smith, 1910) (Colorado, Alberta)
 Orthosia hibisci nubilata (Smith, 1910) (Colorado)
 Orthosia hibisci quinquefasciata (Smith, 1909) (British Columbia, Washington, Oregon, California)

References

Moths described in 1852
Orthosia